The Ivory Carver Trilogy is a trilogy by Sue Harrison that focuses on prehistoric Aleut tribes. The first book, Mother Earth Father Sky, was published in 1990 and was followed up with  My Sister the Moon (1992) and Brother Wind (1994).

Mother Earth Father Sky
Mother Earth Father Sky is the first novel in the trilogy. In this novel, Chagak's tribe is attacked by a warlike tribe, including Man-Who-Kills, who rapes her and is subsequently killed, but becomes the father of her child, Samiq, who becomes an important character in the subsequent novels. It was chosen among the Best Books for Young Adults by the American Library Association in 1991 and was a Main Selection of the Literary Guild Book Club.

Reception
The Los Angeles Times wrote a mixed review for Mother Earth Father Sky, stating that "the beginning of civilization is still a great story" but criticized the work for being too overly detailed to the point where it interrupted the book's flow.

Books
Mother Earth Father Sky (1990) According to WorldCat, the book is held in 2943 libraries  Also translated into Spanish   as Madre tierra, padre cielom into French as Ma mère la terre, mon père le ciel   and into German as Vater Himmel, Mutter Erde 
My Sister the Moon (1992) According to  WorldCat, the book is held in 1974 libraries  Alsdo translated into Spanish as Mi hermana la luna and into French as Ma soeur la Lune .  
Brother Wind (1994) According to WorldCat, the book is held in 1538 libraries. Also translated into Spanish as Mi hermano el viento.

References

External links 

1990 American novels
American young adult novels
Novels set in prehistory
Novels set in Alaska
Avon (publisher) books